Richard Anthony Bean (born 11 June 1956) is an English playwright.

Early years
Born in East Hull, Bean was educated at Hull Grammar School, and then studied social psychology at Loughborough University, graduating with a 2:1 BSc Hons. He then worked as an occupational psychologist, having previously worked in a bread plant for a year and a half after leaving school.

Between 1989 and 1994, Bean also worked as a comedian and went on to be one of the writers and performers of the sketch show Control Group Six (BBC Radio) which was nominated for a Writers Guild Award.

Theatre career
In 1995 he wrote the libretto for Stephen McNeff's opera Paradise of Fools, which premiered at the Unicorn Theatre.

His first full-length play, Of Rats and Men, set in a psychology lab, was staged at the Canal Cafe Theatre in 1996 and went on to the Edinburgh Festival. He adapted it for BBC Radio, starring Anton Lesser, and it was nominated for a Sony Award.

Plays
Of Rats and Men (1996) - premiered at the Canal Cafe Theatre
Toast (1999) - premiered at the Royal Court Theatre, directed by Richard Wilson
Mr England (2000) - premiered at the Crucible Theatre Sheffield, directed by Paul Miller
The Mentalists (2002) - premiered at the National Theatre, directed by Sean Holmes
The God Botherers (2003) - premiered at the Bush Theatre, directed by Will Kerley
Smack Family Robinson (2003) - premiered at the Live Theatre, Newcastle upon Tyne, directed by Jeremy Herrin
Under the Whaleback (2003) - premiered at the Royal Court Theatre, directed by Richard Wilson
Honeymoon Suite (2004) - premiered at the Royal Court Theatre, directed by Paul Miller
Harvest (2005) - premiered at the Royal Court Theatre, directed by Wilson Milam
The Hypochondriac (2005) - a new version of Molière's play, premiered at the Almeida Theatre, directed by Lindsay Posner
Up on Roof (2006) - premiered at the Hull Truck Theatre, directed by Gareth Tudor Price
In the Club (2007) - premiered at the Hampstead Theatre, directed by David Grindley
The English Game (2008) - premiered at the Yvonne Arnaud Theatre, Guildford, directed by Sean Holmes
Pub Quiz Is Life (2009) - premiered at the Hull Truck Theatre, directed by Gareth Tudor Price
England People Very Nice (2009) - premiered at the National Theatre, directed by Nicholas Hytner
House of Games (2010) - an adaptation of the film by David Mamet, premiered at the Almeida Theatre, directed by Lindsay Posner
The Big Fellah (2010) - premiered at the Lyric Hammersmith, directed by Max Stafford-Clark
The Heretic (2011) - premiered at the Royal Court Theatre, directed by Jeremy Herrin
One Man, Two Guvnors (2011) - premiered at the National Theatre, directed by Nicholas Hytner
Great Britain (2014) - premiered at the Royal National Theatre, directed by Nicholas Hytner
Pitcairn (2014) - premiered at the Chichester Festival Theatre, directed by Max Stafford-Clark
Made in Dagenham (2014) - premiered at the Adelphi Theatre, directed by Rupert Goold
The Nap (2016) - premiered at the Crucible Theatre - directed by Richard Wilson
Kiss Me (2016) - premiered at the Hampstead Theatre, directed by Anna Ledwich
The Hypocrite (2017) - premiered at Hull Truck Theatre and Royal Shakespeare Company, directed by Phillip Breen
Young Marx (2017) - with Clive Coleman, premiered at the Bridge Theatre, directed by Nicholas Hytner
Jack Absolute Flies Again (2020) - with Oliver Chris, premiered at the National Theatre, directed by Emily Burns
71 Coltman Street (2022) - premiered at the Hull Truck Theatre, directed by Mark Babych

Awards
 Pearson Award 2002: Best New Play: Honeymoon Suite
 George Devine Award 2002: Best New Play: Under the Whaleback
 Olivier Awards 2005: Best New Play nomination for Harvest
 Evening Standard Awards 2005: Best New Play nomination for Harvest
 Critics' Circle Theatre Awards 2005: Best New Play: Harvest
 TMA Awards 2006: Best New Play nomination for Up on Roof
 Evening Standard Awards 2011: Best New Play The Heretic and One Man, Two Guvnors (both plays joint winners)
 Critics' Circle Theatre Awards 2011: Best New Play One Man, Two Guvnors

References

External links
Theatre Record and its annual indexes
British Theatre Guide for reviews and background information
"Richard Bean: Hot new playwright", British Theatre Guide interview 2001
"Richard Bean: Blurred Boundaries" (The English Game), The Daily Telegraph, 10 May 2008.

English dramatists and playwrights
1956 births
Living people
Writers from Kingston upon Hull
Alumni of Loughborough University
English male dramatists and playwrights